Rising from the ranks, through the ranks or commissioned from the ranks refers to enlisted soldiers being commissioned as officers. In class-conscious societies of the past, such as Britain during the Napoleonic Wars, for example, this was a relatively rare occurrence.

Revolutionary and Napoleonic France
Despite the nickname "the little corporal", Napoleon did not rise from the ranks. (He was commissioned a second lieutenant after graduating from military school.) However, he did famously state, "Tout soldat français porte dans sa giberne le bâton de maréchal de France." ("Every French soldier carries the baton of a marshal of France in his cartridge bag.") That is, any soldier could attain such a lofty rank. And indeed, many seized the opportunities opened to them by the French Revolution and the Napoleonic Wars to serve as such under his command, including:
 Jean Bernadotte, later king of Sweden
 Jean-Baptiste Bessières
 Jean Lannes
 François Joseph Lefebvre
 André Masséna
 Michel Ney
 Nicolas Oudinot
 Jean-de-Dieu Soult
 Claude Victor-Perrin, Duc de Belluno

Post-Napoleonic France
 François Achille Bazaine

United Kingdom
An 1857 report stated the following numbers of non-commissioned officers received commissions in the British Army:
 23 for 1853–4
 101 for 1854–5
 100 for 1855–6
 147 for 1856–7

Sir William Robertson, 1st Baronet, (1860–1933) is the only soldier in the history of the British Army to rise from an enlisted rank to its highest rank, field marshal.

Hector MacDonald (1853–1903) enlisted in the Gordon Highlanders as a private at 17 and finished his career as a major general.

John Horsford (1751–1817) was a British soldier who rose through the ranks to become a major-general in the East India Company's Bengal Army.

Fitzroy Maclean (1911–1996) and Enoch Powell (1912–1998) both enlisted in the British Army as privates and rose to the rank of brigadier during the Second World War. Maclean became a major general after the war.

Sir John Elley (1764–1839) enlisted in the Royal Horse Guards as a private, fought in the Napoleonic Wars and rose to the rank of lieutenant general.

United States
"Mustang" is American military slang for soldiers who rise from the ranks. Notable mustangs include:

 Nathan Bedford Forrest (1821–1877). The famed cavalry leader started as a private in the Confederate States Army and rose to lieutenant general.
 William McKinley (1843–1901). The future president of the United States enlisted as a private in the Union Army in 1861 and received a battlefield commission. His highest rank was brevet major.
 Galusha Pennypacker (1841/1844–1916). Initially an American Civil War quartermaster sergeant in 1861, he was promoted to major general in 1865.
 Winfield Scott (1786–1865). He enlisted in 1807 as a militia cavalry corporal, and was eventually promoted to major general and brevet lieutenant general.
 Chuck Yeager (1923–2020). Yeager enlisted in the United States Army Air Forces as a private in 1941 and rose to brigadier general.

Fiction
In military fiction, this is a not uncommon trope, Richard Sharpe being a prime example.

See also 

 Military rank
 Promotion (rank)
 Battlefield promotion
 Acting rank
 Brevet (military)

References

Military ranks